Benton Township is one of twenty townships in Benton County, Iowa, USA.  As of the 2000 census, its population was 900.

History
Benton Township was founded in 1846.

Geography
According to the United States Census Bureau, Benton Township covers an area of 22.57 square miles (58.46 square kilometers); of this, 22.39 square miles (57.99 square kilometers, 99.2 percent) is land and 0.18 square miles (0.47 square kilometers, 0.8 percent) is water.

Extinct towns
 Benton City at 
(These towns are listed as "historical" by the USGS.)
 Civil Bend

Adjacent townships
 Polk Township (north)
 Washington Township, Linn County (east)
 Fayette Township, Linn County (southeast)
 Canton Township (south)
 Eden Township (southwest)
 Taylor Township (west)

Cemeteries
The township contains McBroom Cemetery.

Lakes
 Ice House Lake

Landmarks
 Pleasant Creek State Par (north edge)

School districts
 Center Point-Urbana Community School District
 Vinton-Shellsburg Community School District

Political districts
 Iowa's 3rd congressional district
 State House District 39
 State Senate District 20

References
 United States Census Bureau 2007 TIGER/Line Shapefiles
 United States Board on Geographic Names (GNIS)
 United States National Atlas

External links
 US-Counties.com
 City-Data.com

Townships in Benton County, Iowa
Cedar Rapids, Iowa metropolitan area
Townships in Iowa
1846 establishments in Iowa Territory
Populated places established in 1846